Bolshoy Nimnyr (Ulaxan Ñımnıır) is a rural locality (a selo) under the administrative jurisdiction of the Town of Aldan in Aldansky District of the Sakha Republic, Russia, located  from Aldan. Its population as of the 2010 Census was 236; down from 479 recorded in the 2002 Census.

Geography
It is located on the north bank of the Bolshoy Nimnyr River, where the river is crossed by the highway to Yakutsk.

History
It was founded in 1929 as a service point on the road being built toward Yakutsk. It was granted urban-type settlement status in 1973 but was demoted back to a rural locality on June 16, 2005. The now abolished rural locality of Maly Nimnyr (lit. Lesser Nimnyr), abandoned in 1997 due to the high cost of supplies and infrastructure, is located nearby.

References

Notes

Sources
Official website of the Sakha Republic. Registry of the Administrative-Territorial Divisions of the Sakha Republic. Aldansky District. 

Rural localities in Aldansky District